Alan Luciano Ruschel (born 23 August 1989), known as Alan Ruschel, is a Brazilian professional footballer who plays as a left back. He is currently playing for Juventude.

Ruschel was one of just six survivors in the crash of LaMia Airlines Flight 2933, which killed 71 people including 19 Chapecoense players.

Club career
Born in Nova Hartz, Rio Grande do Sul, Ruschel started his career at Juventude. He made his senior debut on 20 January 2009, starting in a 1–0 Campeonato Gaúcho home win against Sapucaiense.

Despite appearing regularly in the year's Gauchão, Ruschel never established himself a starter for Juventude, and subsequently served loans at Pelotas and Luverdense. In May 2013, he joined Chapecoense permanently.

On 3 July 2013, Ruschel was caught in a doping exam, and was suspended for six months on 6 August. On 26 December of that year, however, he signed for Série A club Internacional.

A backup to Fabrício, Ruschel made his top tier debut on 14 September 2014 by starting in a 2–0 home win against Botafogo. The following 8 January, he signed a new three-year deal with the club.

On 6 August 2015, Ruschel was loaned to fellow top-tier club Atlético Paranaense, until December. After appearing in just one match, he suffered a knee injury and his loan was cut short.

On 7 June 2016, Ruschel returned to Chape, now in a temporary deal until the end of the campaign. He acted as a second-choice to Dener as his side reached the 2016 Copa Sudamericana Finals for the first time ever.

LaMia Flight 2933 accident

On 28 November 2016, while travelling with Chapecoense to the aforementioned finals, Ruschel was one of only six survivors of the LaMia Flight 2933 accident in the Colombian village of Cerro Gordo, La Unión, Antioquia. The first person to arrive at the hospital, he had a back injury which was later fixed through surgery. A few days later, a video was recorded with Ruschel walking again.

On 7 August 2017, Ruschel played his first match since the incident, playing in the 2017 Joan Gamper Trophy for the first 35 minutes and receiving a standing ovation along with his other two surviving teammates.

Career statistics

Honours
Juventude
 Copa FGF: 2012

Internacional
 Campeonato Gaúcho: 2014, 2015

Chapecoense
 Copa Sudamericana: 2016
 Campeonato Brasileiro Série B: 2020

References

External links
 

1989 births
Living people
Sportspeople from Rio Grande do Sul
Brazilian footballers
Association football defenders
Campeonato Brasileiro Série A players
Campeonato Brasileiro Série B players
Campeonato Brasileiro Série C players
Campeonato Brasileiro Série D players
Esporte Clube Juventude players
Esporte Clube Pelotas players
Luverdense Esporte Clube players
Associação Chapecoense de Futebol players
Sport Club Internacional players
Club Athletico Paranaense players
Goiás Esporte Clube players
Cruzeiro Esporte Clube players
América Futebol Clube (MG) players
Survivors of aviation accidents or incidents
LaMia Flight 2933